Micronola yemeni is a moth of the family Erebidae first described by Michael Fibiger in 2011. It is found in Yemen, Tanzania and Nigeria.

The wingspan is 8.5–11 mm. The head, patagia and first part of the thorax are brownish grey to dark grey. The forewings (including fringes) are brownish grey to dark grey in ssp. yemeni and light grey in ssp. occidentalis. The crosslines are black. The hindwings are grey in ssp. yemeni and whitish grey in ssp. occidentalis. The underside is unicolourous grey and the abdomen is dark grey.

The habitat consists of warm, dry areas in desertlike open grassland with herbaceous plants and rocky biotopes with scattered trees. Adults are on wing at night. They have been recorded in February, March and April, although they probably occur in more generations per year.

Subspecies
Micronola yemeni yemeni Fibiger, 2011 (Yemen and Tanzania)
Micronola yemeni occidentalis Fibiger, 2011 (Nigeria)

References

Micronoctuini
Taxa named by Michael Fibiger
Insects of West Africa
Invertebrates of the Arabian Peninsula
Insects of Tanzania
Moths of Africa
Moths described in 2011